Colin Fleming and Ross Hutchins were the defending champions, but Hutchins did not participate this year because of illness. Fleming played alongside John Peers, but the team lost to James Blake and Jack Sock in the first round.
Blake and Sock went on to win the title, defeating Max Mirnyi and Horia Tecău in the final, 6–4, 6–4.

Seeds

Draw

Draw

References
 Main Draw

Delray Beach International Tennis Championships - Doubles
2013 Doubles
Delray Beach International Tennis Championships - Doubles
2013 Delray Beach International Tennis Championships